Narlı is a village in the Midyat District of Mardin Province in Turkey. The village is populated by Assyrians and by Kurds of the Dermemikan tribe and had a population of 387 in 2021.

References 

Villages in Midyat District
Kurdish settlements in Mardin Province
Assyrian communities in Turkey